Celebrity Poker Club is a British television series featuring celebrities playing poker. It aired on Challenge for three series from 2003 to 2005 as a spin-off from Channel 4's popular Late Night Poker series. Liam Flood was the casino manager for the series, and Cayt Dear was the producer.

Commentators
 Series 1: Jesse May and Barny Boatman
 Series 2: Jesse May and Grub Smith
 Series 3: Jesse May and Victoria Coren, with backstage interviews by Helen Chamberlain

Series finalists

Other celebrities featured have included Dave Gorman, Rory McGrath, Dexter Fletcher, Dennis Taylor, Louise Wener, Nick Leeson, Howard Marks, Charles Ingram, Martin Amis, Al Alvarez, Phil Taylor, Hattie Hayridge, Johnny Vegas, Darren Campbell, Phil Daniels, Graham Linehan, Ally McCoist, Colin Murray and Michael Praed.

Several celebrities playing in the tournament were put forward by celebpoker.com.

External links
Victoria Coren article from The Observer

Channel 4 original programming
Poker tournaments
Television shows about poker
Poker in Europe
Celebrity competitions
2003 British television series debuts
2005 British television series endings
Television series by Banijay